A list of films produced by the Turkish film industry in Turkey in 2008.

Highest-grossing films

Released films

References 

2008
Turkey
Films